Back to You may refer to:

Television
 Back to You (TV series), a short-lived American situation comedy series September 2007 to May 2008

Music
Albums:
 Back to You (album), a 1997 album by Anita Cochran

Songs:
 "Back to You" (Rock Goddess song), 1983
 "Back to You" (Riverdales song), 1995
 "Back to You" (Bryan Adams song), 1997
 "Back to You", by Gotthard from Open, 1998
 "Back to You" (John Mayer song), 2001
 "Back to You" (Brett Anderson song), 2007
 "Back to You" (Thenewno2 song), 2008
 "Back to You" (Mandisa song), 2014
 "Back to You" (Mary Mary song), 2016
 "Back to You" (Mollie King song), 2016
 "Back to You" (Louis Tomlinson song), 2017
 "Back to You", by All That Remains from Madness, 2017
 "Back to You" (Selena Gomez song), 2018
 "Back to You" (Shane Filan song), 2018
 "Back 2 You / Still Grey", a 2004 song by Pendulum
 "Back 2 U", a 2016 song by Steve Aoki and Boehm